Sonia Vigati (born 30 June 1970, in Camposampiero) is a former Italian sprinter.

Biography
Sonia Vigati has 14 caps in national team from 1988 to 1994.

Achievements

National titles
Sonia Vigati has won three times the individual national championship.
1 win on 100 metres (1989)
2 wins on 60 metres indoor (1989, 1900)

See also
 Italian all-time top lists - 100 metres

References

External links
 

1970 births
Italian female sprinters
Living people